is a retired tennis player from Japan.

Inoue twice represented her native country at the Summer Olympics: in 1984 (Los Angeles, California) and 1988 (Seoul, South Korea). In 1982, she became  the first winner of the women's tennis competition at the Asian Games.

WTA Tour finals

Singles (2–0)

References

External links
 
 
 

1964 births
Living people
People from Tokyo
Sportspeople from Tokyo
People from Nakano, Tokyo
Japanese female tennis players
Olympic tennis players of Japan
Tennis players at the 1984 Summer Olympics
Tennis players at the 1988 Summer Olympics
Asian Games medalists in tennis
Tennis players at the 1982 Asian Games
Asian Games gold medalists for Japan
Asian Games silver medalists for Japan
Asian Games bronze medalists for Japan
Medalists at the 1982 Asian Games
20th-century Japanese women
21st-century Japanese women